Kathiawar is a peninsula, near the far north of India's west coast, of about  bordering the Arabian Sea. It is bounded by the Gulf of Kutch in the northwest and by the Gulf of Khambhat (Gulf of Cambay) in the east. In the northeast, it is connected to the rest of Gujarat and borders on the low, fertile hinterland of Ahmedabad. It is crossed by two belts of hill country and is drained radially by nine rivers which have little natural flow aside from in monsoon months, thus dams have been built on some of these. Kathiawar ports have been flourishing centres of trade and commerce since at least the 16th century.

Etymology and history 
Kathiawad means the land of the Kathis, a Kshatriya caste who migrated to the region in the 8th century and controlled the southwestern peninsula of contemporary Gujarat.

History 

Kathis were spread out in the entire region and dominated central Saurashtra for some centuries. Although the Kathis are believed to have migrated to the area as late as the 16th century, they have played an important part in the documented history of the region. During the reign of Pratihar ruler Mihir Bhoj, the Rajput empire stretched from Kathiawad to the Bay of Bengal. A Haddola inscription confirms that  Pratihars continued to rule in this region during the reign of Mahipala I. The peninsula is dotted with antiquities and has a continuous history from prehistoric times to the early periods of the Mahabharata through the Indus civilization. Kathi people particularly influenced the peninsula between the 16th century to the mid-20th century.

In a geopolitical context, the area of Kathiawar forms the core of Saurashtra. In feudal times, there were certain principal divisions in Saurashtra that fell under princely states: Rajkot State, Jamnagar State, Gondal State, Bhavnagar State, Dhrangadhra State, Morbi State, Jasdan State, Jetpur State, and Wankaner State, Wadhwan State, Limdi state .However, the main area of Kathiawar now covers 10 districts: Rajkot, Bhavnagar, Jamnagar, Surendranagar, Porbandar, Amreli, Junagadh, Botad, Morbi, Gir-Somnath.

For a long time, the name Sorath remained limited to the region when the Chudasama Rajput (Raa' dynasty) ruled from 875 to 1473. At the same time, major Rajput clans that held a sway over this region included the Walas (Kathis), Jethwas, Raijadas, Chudasamas, Gohils, Jhalas, Jadejas, Chavdas, Parmars, Patgirs or Pargirss, Sarvaiyas, Solankis, Khumans and Khachars, Makwanas, Padayas, and Zalas. Most of the princely states of Kathiawar were brought under the British protectorate by 1820, but the first treaty with the British was made from Kathiawar between Vira Wala (Kathi Ruler) of Jetpur and Colonel Walker at Baroda on 26 October 1803.

Literary comment 

The state of the region in the early nineteenth century is shown in Letitia Elizabeth Landon's poetical illustration, "Scene in Kattiawar", to an engraving of a painting by Clarkson Frederick Stanfield.

Political history 

Before Indian independence in 1947, most of Kathiawar was divided into numerous princely states that were ruled by local potentates who acknowledged British suzerainty in return for local sovereignty. These states comprised the Kathiawar Agency. The rest of the peninsula, primarily in the east along the Gulf of Cambay, were districts ruled directly by the British as part of British India's Bombay Presidency, which included part of the peninsula.

After Indian independence, the states of Kathiawar acceded to India under the Instrument of Accession. In 1947, Junagadh's Muslim ruler acceded his territory to Pakistan. The predominantly Hindu population rebelled, and while the prince fled to Pakistan, a referendum was conducted that merged the kingdom into the Indian Union. The former princely states of Kathiawar were grouped into the new province of Saurashtra, which became the state of Saurashtra in 1950. In 1956, Saurashtra was merged into Bombay State, and in 1960, Bombay state was divided along linguistic lines into the new states of Gujarat (including Kathiawar) and Maharashtra. Diu was under Portuguese rule until it was occupied by Indian troops by 1961. It integrated into India as part of the union territory of Goa, Daman and Diu in 1962.

Major cities 
The major cities of Kathiawar are Rajkot in the center of the peninsula, Jamnagar on the Gulf of Kutch, Bhavnagar on the Gulf of Khambhat, Surendranagar and the historic city Wadhwan in the central portion of Gujarat, Porbandar on the west coast, and the historic city of Junagadh in the South. Diu, an island town formerly part of Portuguese India and now part of the Indian union territory of Dadra and Nagar Haveli and Daman and Diu, lies off the south coast of Kathiawar. The city of Somnath and its temple are also located on the south coast.

Districts in Kathiawad Region 
 Amreli
 Botad
 Bhavnagar
 Devbhoomi Dwarka
 Gir Somnath
 Jamnagar
 Junagadh
 Morbi
 Porbandar
 Rajkot
 Surendranagar

Geography and ecosystem 

The natural vegetation on most of the peninsula is xeric scrub. A range of low hills known as the Gir Hills occupies the south-central portion of the peninsula. The highest of these is Girnar. The hills are home to an enclave of tropical dry broadleaf forest.

Gir National Park and its surroundings host the last remaining Asiatic lion population. Other national parks in Kathiawar are Blackbuck National Park, Velavadar on the Gulf of Cambay, and Marine National Park, Gulf of Kutch, near Jamnagar.

Antiquity (places: history, archaeology, nature, religion) 

 Dwarika
 Somnath
 Sasan Gir and interiors / Kathi territories in Amreli-Bhavnagar districts
 Vallabhi
 Porbandar
 Junagadh
 Shatrunjay Hills, Palitana
 Sihor
 Palitana
 Virpur (Rajkot) and Gondal
 Jamnagar & Marine National Park
 Velavadar
 Old cities of Gondal, Wadhvan, Morbi, Wankaner
 Diu, India

Notable characters and figures

Religion, pre-history, spirituality 
 Sudama – Krishna's friend and a character from Mahabharata
 Baba Balak Nath – One of the legendary Naths and Chaurasi Siddhas
 Neminath – One of the Siddhas and 22nd Jain Tirthankar
 Narsinh Mehta (1414-1481) – Poet and saint
 Swaminarayan – Believed to be the manifestation of Purushottam/Parabrahma. Also known as Sahajanand Swami
 Pramukh Swami Maharaj – Guru and Pramukh, or president, of the BAPS Swaminarayan Sanstha, an international Hindu socio-spiritual organization.
 Dayanand Saraswati – Hindu religious scholar, reformer, and founder of the Arya Samaj
 Jalaram Bapa – A mystic and saint
 Shrimad Rajchandra – A prominent Jain philosopher
 Morari Bapu – Preacher, teacher, thinker
 Ramesh Bhai Ojha (Hindi: रमेश भाई ओझा) – Hindu spiritual leader and preacher of Vedanta Philosophy
 Gangasati – Paanbai & Kahadsinhji Gohil mystic saints near samadhiyala
 Kanji Swami – Jain scholar & Saint of Songadh, Also known as "Koh-i-Noor of Kathiawar"

Society, ideology, politics, leadership 
 Sardar Vallabha bhai Patel
 Mohandas Karamchand Gandhi – pre-eminent political and ideological leader of India, and Father of Nation
 Muhammad Ali Jinnah – lawyer, politician, statesman and the founder of Pakistan and Pakistani Father of the Nation
 U. N. Dhebar – Freedom fighter (Indian independence), and President of the Indian National Congress
 Virchand Gandhi – First Gujarati Patriot from Mahuva to visit USA officially and participate in first World Religion Parliament, 1893
 Fatima Jinnah – Mother of Pakistani Nation

Governance, nobility, reforms, politics 
 Nawab Sir Muhammad Mahabat Khan III – Babi of Junagadh state
 Maharaja Sir Takhtsinhji Gohil of Bhavnagar – Reformist and progressive ruler who constructed the Bhavnagar State Railway
 Maharaja Bhagvatsinhji of Gondal – A progressive and enlightened ruler, wrote Bhagavadgomandal
  Maharaja Digvijaysinhji Ranjitsinhji Jadeja of Jamnagar - India's first delegate at the League of Nations in 1920, then a UN represtative, Head of Korean War rehabilitation. Sheltered 500 Polish children in his state during WWII; The Good Maharaja 
 Maharaja Krishnakumar Sinjhji Gohil – Reformist, progressive and noble Maharaja of Bhavnagar
 Balwantrai Mehta – Freedom fighter, social worker and pioneer of concept of Panchayati Raj
 Jivraj Mehta – Politician, first Chief Minister of Gujarat, aa Surgeon.

Art, literature, poetry, journalism, socialism 
 Jhaverchand Meghani – Litterateur, social reformer and freedom fighter
 Kalaguru Ravishankar Raval – a painter, art teacher, art critic, journalist and essayist
 Dalpatram – Poet of Gujarati literature
 Nanalal Dalpatram Kavi – Author and poet
 Sursinhji Takthasinhji Gohil – Known for poetry and Gujarati literature
 Dula Bhaya Kag – Poet, social reformer and freedom fighter
 Amrut Ghayal – Shayar of Gujarati Ghazal
 Kavi Kant – Poet
 Harilal Upadhyay – Author in the Gujarati language
 Chunilal Madia – Author, playwright, poet, journalist, editor
 Ghulam Mohammed Sheikh – Painter, writer, art critic
 Rajendra Shukla – Poet
 Ramesh Parekh – Poet
 Ruswa Majhalumi- Imamuddin Murtaza Khan Babi, a Gujarati language poet and a royal of Pajod state.

Sports, adventure 
 K. S. Ranjitsinhji – Maharaja of Nawanagar, cricketer
 Kumar Shri Duleepsinhji – Cricketer
 Vinoo Mankad – Cricketer
 Ashok Mankad – Cricketer
 Dilip Doshi – Cricketer
 Karsan Ghavri – Cricketer
 Ashok Patel – Cricketer
 Dhiraj Parsana – Cricketer
 Ajay Jadeja – Cricketer
 Parthiv Patel – Cricketer
 Ravindra Jadeja – Cricketer
 Siddharth Trivedi – Cricketer
 Cheteshwar Pujara –  Cricketer
 Jaydev Unadkat –  Cricketer

Cinema, entertainment, music, folklore 
 Mohammed Chhel – A magician and a Fakir (mystic)
 Vijay Bhatt – Producer, director and screenwriter
 Nanabhai Bhatt – Indian film director and producer; father of Mahesh Bhatt and Mukesh Bhatt
 Dina Pathak – Actor, director of Gujarati theatre, activist
 Asha Parekh – Actress, director, and producer
 Shahabuddin Rathod – Humorist, writer, teacher
 Parveen Babi – Bollywood actress
 Dimple Kapadia – Bollywood actress
 Manhar Udhas – One of the top Ghazalkars
 Pankaj Udhas – Indian singer, Ghazal singer
 Mehul Kumar – Director, producer
 K. Lal –  Indian magician
 Alka Yagnik – Singer
 Ben Kingsley – Actor (ancestral roots in Saurashtra)
 Hemant Chauhan – Singer, Bhajanik
 Neeraj Vora – Film director, dialogue writer, actor
 Himesh Reshammiya – Music composer, singer, artist
 Dilip Joshi – Cinema and television actor
 Anjum Rajabali –  Screenwriter, actor, producer
 Chhel Vayeda –  Art director and production designer
 Pan Nalin –  Film director, screenwriter and documentary maker
 Sanjay Chhel –  Film director, writer and lyricist

Business, industry, innovation, entrepreneurship, philanthropy 
 Nanji Kalidas Mehta – Industrialist and philanthropist
 Muljibhai Madhvani – Businessman, entrepreneur, industrialist and philanthropist
 Nautamlal Bhagavanji Mehta – Freedom fighter, businessman
 Dhirubhai Ambani – Indian business magnate and entrepreneur who founded Reliance Industries
 Abdul Gaffar Billoo – Pakistani pediatric endocrinologist and philanthropist
 Ahmed Dawood – Industrialist and philanthropist
 Sam Pitroda – Inventor, entrepreneur and policymaker
 Tulsi Tanti – Chairman and managing director of Suzlon Energy
 Abdul Sattar Edhi – Founded Edhi Foundation helping poor and needy

History and culture 
 Prince Vijaya – Exiled prince of Sihor colonising Sri Lanka
 Ra Navghan – Historical character during Solanki period
 Devayat Bodar - Historical warrior and savior of Ra Navghan
 Kadu Makrani – Insurgent of the Indian rebellion of 1857
 Mohkam Singh – one of the punj pyare of Sikh religion, was born in Dwarka

See also 
 Koli piracy in India
 Saurashtra Kingdom
 Maurya Empire
 Saurashtra language
 Bhagavadgomandal
 State Bank of Saurashtra
 Memons (Kathiawar)
 Ranji Trophy
 Kathiawari Horse Breed
 Gir Cattle or Gir Gaay

References

External links

Cultural history of Gujarat
Gulf of Khambhat
Landforms of Gujarat
Peninsulas of India
Rajkot
Regions of Gujarat
Saurashtra (region)